Grafton Tyler Brown (February 22, 1841 – March 2, 1918) was an American painter, lithographer and cartographer. Brown was the first African-American artist to create works depicting the Pacific Northwest and California.

Early life and education
He was born on February 22, 1841, in Harrisburg, Pennsylvania. His parents were Wilhelmina and Thomas Brown, who were born free in Maryland and moved to Pennsylvania in 1837. His father was a freedman and was involved in the abolitionist movement. Brown worked for a printer in Philadelphia when he was fourteen. It was there where he learned the skill of lithography.

Career

Brown moved to San Francisco in 1858 and worked as a hotel steward and porter. He worked as a lithographer before becoming known as a painter in the 1880s. In San Francisco, he worked at Kuchel & Dressel from 1861–1867. In 1867 he opened his own firm. Economic activity in California that was supported by mining activity led to Brown creating advertisements, maps, and scrip for a range of clients throughout the 1870s. In 1878 he created The Illustrated History of San Francisco, which consisted of 72 topographical images of the city. Brown's work in the Bay Area and in the Nevada Territory included documentation of settlements, property sales, claims and city boundaries.

The following year he sold his company. He left the Bay Area in 1882 and moved to Victoria, British Columbia. While there, he participated in the Amos Bowman Geological Survey. While participating in the survey, he served as draftsman and documented the Cascade Mountains. In 1884 he moved back to the United States and traveled throughout the northwest and west, painting such sites as Mount Rainier. He lived in Portland, Oregon, painting landscapes and also traveling to Yosemite and Yellowstone National Park to paint. Grafton Tyler Brown was a painter whose identity changed from Black to white as he moved across the Pacific Northwest.

In 1893, Brown moved to Saint Paul, Minnesota. In St. Paul he worked again as a draftsman, this time for the United States Army Corps of Engineers and for the city of St. Paul's engineering department. He died in St. Peter, Minnesota, on March 2, 1918.

Brown's works are held in the collections of the Royal British Columbia Museum, Oakland Museum of California, Crocker Art Museum in Sacramento, California Smithsonian American Art Museum, and the Los Angeles County Museum of Art.

Notable exhibitions
Blacks in the Westward Movement, 1975, Anacostia Community Museum 
Grafton Tyler Brown: Visualizing California and the Pacific Northwest, California African American Museum and Walters Art Museum

References

External links

Selections of Nineteenth-Century Afro-American Art, a Metropolitan Museum of Art exhibition catalog
Grafton Tyler Brown, Smithsonian American Art Museum

American cartographers
American landscape painters
American lithographers
Artists from Harrisburg, Pennsylvania
Artists from Saint Paul, Minnesota
Artists from San Francisco
Artists from Portland, Oregon
1841 births
1918 deaths
19th-century American painters
American male painters
20th-century American painters
Painters from Pennsylvania
Painters from Minnesota
Painters from California
20th-century American printmakers
African-American history in Portland, Oregon
Artists from British Columbia
African-American history of Oregon
United States Army Corps of Engineers personnel
History of Black people in British Columbia
19th-century American male artists
20th-century American male artists
African-American printmakers
20th-century African-American painters
20th-century lithographers